Thanga Magan is a 1983 Indian Tamil-language action film directed by A. Jagannathan, starring Rajinikanth and Poornima Jayaram. The film was released on 4 November 1983 and became a success.

Plot 

Arun is the haughty and belligerent son of rich parents Chidambaram and Annapoorani. Arun runs into constant tiffs with a pretty but combative hotel dancer, Chitra and eventually they both fall in love. One night, when a hit man Kali, sent by his rivals attempts to murder Arun in his house and Chidambaram seems to recognise the hitman and lets him escape, Arun confronts his father to know the truth. Chidambaram reveals to Arun that he is not his real son and years ago he and Kali had been deputed to kill the infant Arun and his mother by Arun's own father. But the kind-hearted Chidambaram had decided to adopt and raise Arun as his son.

In another twist, Arun finds out that his real mother is Laxmi, an abandoned woman who had been living in Chitra's house. Arun is distraught when Chidambaram's version of the events of yore raise questions and doubts about a reticent Laxmi's past and morality. Laxmi later reveals to all how she had been deceived to lie in court of being immoral and later ordered to be killed by her criminal husband Velliangiri as a part of his nefarious designs to save his associate Rajalingam. Velliangiri and Rajalingam who had in fact sent Kali to eliminate Arun, now aim to kill Laxmi as well when they learn she is alive. Once the truth about her witness statement is known in the case of the murder, Laxmi is arrested. While Arun tries to bail her out, Chidambaram is forced to take her from jail due to the threat to Annapoorani's life. Laxmi is then captured by Velliangiri and is tied up in his bungalow. Arun enters the bungalow as Reddy garu for the sake of espionage and to inform the police of Laxmi's whereabouts. Arun battles to protect his mother and bring his criminal father and Rajalingam to justice in the rest of the story.

Cast 
 Rajinikanth as Arun
 Poornima Jayaram as Chithra
 Jaishankar as Rajalingam
 Thengai Srinivasan as Velliangiri
 Silk Smitha as Rekha
 Raveendran as Ravi/ Delhi Ganesh as Ravi's voice over
 C. R. Vijayakumari as Laxmi
 Manorama as Annapoorani
 V. K. Ramasamy as Chidambaram
 V. Gopalakrishnan as Captain Raghuram
 R. S. Manohar as Kali
 C. R. Parthiban as Police Commissioner
 Poornam Viswanathan as Judge
 Neelu
 Loose Mohan
Gundu Kalyanam
 Thayir Vadai Desigan
 Anuradha (Special appearance in Machaana Paaradi)

Soundtrack 
The music was composed by Ilaiyaraaja.

Release 
The film was released on 4 November 1983 and became a super hit among 1983 Diwali releases.

References

External links 
 

1980s Tamil-language films
1983 action films
1983 films
Films directed by A. Jagannathan
Films scored by Ilaiyaraaja
Indian action films